María Agustina Nieto Serra (born 15 May 1989) is an indoor and field hockey player from Uruguay.

Personal life
Agustina Nieto was born and raised in Montevideo, Uruguay. She is one of five siblings, having four brothers.

Career

Field hockey
Nieto made her debut for Las Cimarronas in 2008, at the South American Championship in Montevideo. Since her debut, Nieto has gone on the represent the national team in multiple major tournaments, and in 2016 became captain of the national team.

She has won two medals at the South American Games, bronze at the 2014 edition in Santiago and silver at the 2018 edition in Cochabamba.

In 2019, she was a member of the team at the Pan American Games in Lima.

Indoor
Agustina Nieto made her debut for the Uruguayan indoor team at the 2010 Indoor Pan American Cup, where she won a silver medal.

She went on to represent the team again at the 2011 Indoor World Cup in Poznań, as well as the 2014 and 2017 Indoor Pan American Cups in Montevideo and Georgetown respectively.

References

External links

1989 births
Living people
Female field hockey defenders
Uruguayan female field hockey players
South American Games silver medalists for Uruguay
South American Games bronze medalists for Uruguay
South American Games medalists in field hockey
Competitors at the 2014 South American Games
Competitors at the 2018 South American Games
Pan American Games competitors for Uruguay
Field hockey players at the 2015 Pan American Games
Field hockey players at the 2019 Pan American Games